A financier is a person who obtains financing for a business venture. 

Financier or The Financier may also refer to:
 Financier (cake), a small French almond cake
 The Financier, a 1912 novel by Theodore Dreiser
 The Financier, a British publication which was merged into Financier and Bullionist